This is a list of seasons completed by the Hawaii Rainbow Warriors football program since the team's conception in 1909. The list documents season-by-season records.

Seasons 

Notes

References

Hawaii

Hawaii Rainbow Warriors football seasons